Myrcianthes ferreyrae is a species of tree in the family Myrtaceae. It is endemic to the lomas, or fog oases, found on the coastal hills of the region of Arequipa, Peru.

References

ferreyrae
Vulnerable plants
Trees of Peru
Endemic flora of Peru